The Police Intelligence Department (PID) is a staff department of the Singapore Police Force (SPF). Its primary purpose is to collate and analyse information obtained from the various departments of the SPF, as well as other sources, to support law enforcement activities in Singapore. The department is also the staff authority on matters relating to intelligence in the Singapore Police Force (SPF).

History
On 1 April 1973, the Criminal Intelligence Unit (Abbreviation: CIU) was set up within the Criminal Investigation Department (Abbreviation: CID) to support CID's investigation efforts. It was then realised that there was a tremendous amount of valuable information that can be obtained from the land divisions. In October 1988, the Intelligence Division was set up within the CID following a reorganisation of the CIU structure.

On 28 March 1996, the Intelligence Division was upgraded to a full-fledged department in the SPF, marking the division's progress and reflecting its value and contribution in the fight against crime. Past directors include Hoong Wee Teck the incumbent Police Commissioner.

Present Day
Key contact numbers, with an international dialling code of +(65), remain offered by the Singapore Police Force as they were:
Emergencies 999 
Police Hotline 1800 - 255 0000 
Traffic Hotline 6 547 0000

References

Singapore Police Force